Bivin may refer to:

Bivin (surname)
Bivin of Gorze (810–863), Frankish lay abbot
USS Bivin (DE-536), a US Navy destroyer escort named after Vernard Eugene Bivin

See also
Bivins